I Don't Care may refer to:

Albums
 I Don't Care (album), a 1964 album by Buck Owens
 I Don't Care: The Album, a 1990 album by Audio Two

Songs
 "I Don't Care" (Eva Tanguay song), 1905
 "I Don't Care (If Tomorrow Never Comes)", a 1947 song by Hank Williams
 "I Don't Care" (Webb Pierce song), 1955, covered by Ricky Skaggs
 "I Don't Care (Just as Long as You Love Me)", a 1964 song by Buck Owens
 "I Don't Care" (Elton John song), 1978
 "I Don't Care" (Shakespears Sister song), 1992
 "I Don't Care" (Angela Via song), 2000; covered by Delta Goodrem, 2001
 "I Don't Care" (Ricky Martin song), 2005
 "I Don't Care" (Apocalyptica song), 2007 
 "I Don't Care" (Fall Out Boy song), 2008
 "I Don't Care" (2NE1 song), 2009
 "I Don't Care" (Elle Varner song), 2012
 "I Love It" (Icona Pop song), 2012, sometimes referred to by this title
 "I Don't Care" (Cheryl song), 2014
 "I Don't Care" (Ed Sheeran and Justin Bieber song), 2019
 "I Don't Care", by Black Flag from Everything Went Black, covered by the Circle Jerks
 "I Don't Care", a song from the Bratz Rock Angelz soundtrack, 2005
 "I Don't Care", by Green Day, featured as a subtrack to the medley "Jesus of Suburbia"
 "I Don't Care", by New Boyz from Too Cool to Care
 "I Don't Care", by Nikki Lane from All or Nothin'
 "I Don't Care", by Ramones from Rocket to Russia
 "I Don't Care", by Rich the Kid from Keep Flexin
 "I Don't Care", by Snoop Dogg from 220

See also 
 Don't Care (disambiguation)
 Don't Really Care (disambiguation)
 I Don't Really Care (disambiguation)